Anydraula glycerialis is a species of moth of the family Crambidae described by Francis Walker in 1859. It is found in the Australian states of Queensland and New South Wales.

References

Acentropinae
Moths of Australia
Moths of Queensland
Moths described in 1859